loader.io is a cloud-based load and scalability testing service SaaS that allows developers to test their web applications and API with thousands of concurrent connections.

Capabilities
Loader.io is a cloud-based load testing service for developers to test performance and scalability with their web applications and APIs.

It provides simple cloud-based load testing:
 Load testing for web applications and APIs for performance and scalability 
 Integration with PaaS providers, continuous integration tools, and browsers
 Allows testing up to 50,000 concurrent connections for free 
 It is cloud-based, so it is a no install solution and immediately available for developers to test.

It was born out of SendGrid Labs in late 2012.

See also 
 Cloud testing
 Web testing

References

Cloud computing providers
Software testing
Load testing tools